TVNZ Sport is a division of TVNZ which airs many of the sports telecasts in New Zealand.

TVNZ Sport broadcasts programs like The Championships, Wimbledon, Commonwealth Games, and the America's Cup.

TVNZ Sport was originally known as One Sport and later 1 Sport. It was renamed due to sports being broadcast on both TVNZ 1 and TVNZ Duke.

Past Sports Rights Held
They previously held the rights to live coverage of the international rugby union until 1996, live cricket matches until 1999, and the Olympic Games until 2008.

Exclusive programming

Current

New Zealand Cricket home T20 internationals - Free-to-air partner with Spark Sport
Men's Super Smash and Women's Super Smash - All 64 games.
 Paralympic Games

Previous

 Super Rugby
 The Barclays Premier League
 World Rugby Sevens Series Wellington tournament only
 New Zealand Golf Open
 V8 Supercars and the Bathurst 1000
 Wellington 500
 New Zealand ASB Tennis Classic
 New Zealand Heineken Tennis Open
 FA Cup (semis and final only)
 The Championships, Wimbledon
 Commonwealth Games
 Olympic Games
 2020 Olympic Games - Free-to-air partner with Sky Sport
 Rugby World Cup - Free-to-air partner with Spark Sport
 2021 America's Cup

See also

 Sky Sport (New Zealand)
 Spark Sport

References

External links
 One Sport

TVNZ 1 original programming